Equatorial Guinea competed at the 2020 Summer Olympics in Tokyo. Originally scheduled to take place from 24 July to 9 August 2020, the Games have been postponed to 23 July to 8 August 2021, due to the COVID-19 pandemic. It was the nation's tenth appearance at the Summer Olympics since its debut in 1984.

Competitors
The following is the list of number of competitors in the Games.

Athletics

Equatorial Guinea received universality slots from IAAF to send two athletes to the Olympics.

Track & road events

Swimming

Equatorial Guinea received a universality invitation from FINA to send one male top-ranked swimmer in his respective individual event to the Olympics, based on the FINA Points System of 28 June 2021.

References

Olympics
2020
Nations at the 2020 Summer Olympics